The 2013 Oklahoma Sooners football team represented the University of Oklahoma in the 2013 NCAA Division I FBS football season, the 119th season of Sooner football. The team was led by two-time Walter Camp Coach of the Year Award winner, Bob Stoops, in his 15th season as head coach. They played their home games at Gaylord Family Oklahoma Memorial Stadium in Norman, Oklahoma. They were a charter member of the Big 12 Conference.

Conference play began at home on September 7 with a win against the West Virginia Mountaineers and ended in the annual Bedlam Series on December 7 against the Oklahoma State Cowboys in Stillwater with the Sooners upsetting the Cowboys 33–24 on the road. With the victory over the Kansas State Wildcats on November 23, head coach Bob Stoops got his 158th career win to move past Barry Switzer for the most wins in program history. After finishing the regular season with a record of 10–2 (7–2 in Big 12 play), finishing in a tie for second place in the conference, the Sooners received an at-large bid to play in the Sugar Bowl, where they upset the Alabama Crimson Tide with a final score of 45–31.
a upset on Texas tech on 30-38 

Following the season, Jalen Saunders and Aaron Colvin were selected in the fourth round of the 2014 NFL Draft, along with Corey Nelson and Trey Millard in the seventh.

Preseason

Recruits

Award watch lists

Fred Biletnikoff Award
Trey Metoyer
Jalen Saunders

Lou Groza Award
 Michael Hunnicutt
Lombardi Award
Gabe Ikard

Maxwell Award
Blake Bell

Rimington Trophy
Gabe Ikard

William V. Campbell Trophy
Gabe Ikard

Schedule

Roster

Depth chart

Game summaries

Louisiana–Monroe

West Virginia

Tulsa

Notre Dame

TCU

Texas (Red River Rivalry)

Kansas

Texas Tech

Baylor

Iowa State

Kansas State

Oklahoma State (Bedlam Series)

Alabama (Sugar Bowl)

Rankings

Statistics

Team

Lowest fourth down conversion rate allowed since 2003
Highest average time of possession since 2004
Least passing first downs and passing yards and lowest average margin of victory (10.7), third down conversion rate and total attendance since 2005
Least first downs, third down conversions, total offense, total plays, passing yards per game, passing touchdowns, pass completions and attempts since 2006
Lowest average punt since 2008
Highest passing completion percentage and kick return average allowed since 2008

Scores by quarter

Least third quarter points scored since 2005
Most first quarter points allowed since 2006
Most fourth quarter points scored since 2007
Most third quarter points allowed since 2008

Postseason

Awards
Freshman Dominique Alexander was named Big 12 Conference Defensive Freshman of the Year.

All-Americans
Oklahoma's only All-American this year was Gabe Ikard. He was given first team All-American status by the American Football Coaches Association (AFCA), Walter Camp Foundation (WCFF), and CBS Sports (CBS).

All Big 12 team

2014 NFL Draft

The 2014 NFL Draft was held at Radio City Music Hall in New York City on May 8–10, 2014. The following Oklahoma players were either selected or signed as free agents following the draft.

References

External links
 

Oklahoma
Oklahoma Sooners football seasons
Sugar Bowl champion seasons
Oklahoma Sooners football